Frankenstein Must Be Destroyed is a 1969 British horror film directed by Terence Fisher for Hammer Films, starring Peter Cushing, Freddie Jones, Veronica Carlson and Simon Ward. The film is the fifth in a series of Hammer films focusing on Baron Frankenstein, who, in this entry, terrorises those around him in a bid to uncover the secrets of a former associate confined to a lunatic asylum.

Plot
A doctor is decapitated by a masked man while a thief breaks into an underground lab. The masked man enters the lab, carrying the severed head, and fights the thief, who escapes in horror. The man unmasks himself and is revealed to be Baron Victor Frankenstein. The thief goes to the police station to report the severed head to Inspector Frisch. Frankenstein, under the alias Mr. Fenner, rents a room at a boarding house run by landlady Anna Spengler. Anna's fiancé Karl Holst is a doctor at the asylum where Frankenstein's former assistant Dr. Frederick Brandt was committed after going insane.

After discovering Karl has been stealing narcotics in order to support Anna's ailing mother, Frankenstein reveals his true identity and blackmails Karl into helping him kidnap Brandt so he can get the secret formula of his experiment. While stealing equipment from a warehouse for Frankenstein's new lab, Karl and the Baron are caught by the guard. Karl panics and stabs him. Frankenstein, now with a further hold on Karl uses him and Anna to kidnap Brandt. They take him back to the house where they build a lab in the basement. Karl confides to Anna about killing the guard and begs her to leave, fearing she may go to prison for being an accessory to a murderer, but she refuses.

Meanwhile, Brandt has a heart attack, prompting Frankenstein and Karl to kidnap the asylum's administrator Professor Richter to transplant Brandt's brain into his body. That night, while Anna is getting ready for bed, Frankenstein enters her room and rapes her. The next day, Frankenstein and Karl succeed in transplanting Brandt's brain into Richter's body and bury Brandt's body in the garden. Brandt's wife Ella recognises Frankenstein in the street and confronts him about her husband's kidnapping. Frankenstein assures her he has cured her husband's mental illness, but does not let her see him. She refuses to believe him and goes to Frisch.

While the creature recovers, Frankenstein and the lovers relocate to a deserted manor house when the police begin to close in. In the lab, the creature awakes and is horrified by his appearance. He scares Anna, who stabs him, causing him to escape. Frankenstein returns and finds the creature gone. In a rage, he fatally stabs Anna and goes after the creature. The creature makes it to his former home, but his wife refuses to accept him as her husband. Wanting revenge on Frankenstein and knowing the Baron will eventually track him there, he allows his wife to go free and pours liquid paraffin around the house.

Frankenstein soon arrives, with Karl following. Inside the house, the creature makes fires to trap him. Frankenstein finds the papers of discovery and flees, but is ambushed by Karl, and they fight. The creature emerges, knocks Karl out and carries a screaming Frankenstein into the burning house, where they both presumably die.

Cast

 Peter Cushing as Baron Victor Frankenstein
 Freddie Jones as Professor Richter/The Creature
 Simon Ward as Dr. Karl Holst 
 Veronica Carlson as Anna Spengler
 George Pravda as Dr. Frederick Brandt
 Maxine Audley as Ella Brandt
 Thorley Walters as Inspector Frisch
 Windsor Davies as Police Sergeant
 Allan Surtees as Police Sergeant
 Geoffrey Bayldon as Police Doctor
 Colette O'Neil as Madwoman
 Frank Middlemass as Guest - Plumber
 Norman Shelley as Guest - Smoking pipe
 Michael Gover as Guest - Reading newspaper
 George Belbin as Guest - Playing chess
 Peter Copley as Principal
 Jim Collier as Dr. Heidecke

Production
The scene where Frankenstein rapes Anna was filmed over the objections of both Peter Cushing and Veronica Carlson, and director Terence Fisher, who halted it when he felt enough was enough. It was not in the original script, but the scene was added at the insistence of Hammer executive James Carreras, who was under pressure to keep the American distributors happy.

The scenes featuring Thorley Walters as Inspector Frisch were also late additions to the original script; they have been described as unnecessary, adding an unwelcome element of comedy into the suspenseful story and also making the film too long.

Welsh version
In 1978, the Welsh television station HTV Cymru/Wales broadcast a version dubbed into the Welsh language called Rhaid Dinistrio Frankenstein, a more-or-less literal translation of the English title. This was one of three films that were dubbed into Welsh, another being Shane, with Alan Ladd. Both these were rebroadcast on the new Welsh language channel S4C on its launch in 1982.

Reception
Variety called the film "a good-enough example of its low-key type, with artwork rather better than usual (less obvious backcloths, etc.) a minimum of artless dialogue, good lensing by Arthur Grant and a solid all round cast." The Monthly Film Bulletin called it "the most spirited Hammer horror in some time. The crudities still remain, of course, but the talk of transplants and drugs seem to have injected new life into the continuing story of Baron Frankenstein."
 
Frankenstein Must Be Destroyed currently holds an average 70% on Rotten Tomatoes.

See also
 Frankenstein in popular culture
 List of films featuring Frankenstein's monster

References

External links

 
 
 

1969 films
British science fiction horror films
Films shot at Associated British Studios
1960s science fiction horror films
Frankenstein films
1969 horror films
Hammer Film Productions horror films
Films directed by Terence Fisher
Films scored by James Bernard
Films set in Europe
Warner Bros. films
1960s English-language films
1960s British films